Eureka Online College (EoC) was founded in 2012, initially to provide online CPD for teachers of science and maths. It has since grown and in 2015 had its subject knowledge enhancement courses listed on the NCTL website, benefitting preITT students throughout the UK studying with either SCITT providers or universities.

Subject Knowledge Enhancement (SKE)
It is a government initiative to help increase the number of teachers in these shortage subjects. SKE courses are available to graduates that would like to train to become a teacher of biology, chemistry, physics, maths or geography, but have small knowledge gaps.

Online provision
Blackboard Learn is the VLE used to host and deliver EOC courses, giving students access to the learning material 24/7. EOC makes full use of technology in the delivery of its courses. Online lessons are hosted via Cisco’s meeting platform and Blackboard Collaborate.

References

Online colleges
2012 establishments in the United Kingdom
Distance education institutions based in the United Kingdom